Dysschema sacrifica is a moth in the subfamily Arctiinae, of the family Erebidae. The species first described by Jacob Hübner in 1831. It is found in Brazil.

In Spanish, this moth is called the mariposa tigre, a name it shares with the butterfly Danaus chrysippus.

References

Moths described in 1831
Dysschema
Arctiinae of South America